The Magothy Quartzite Quarry Archeological Site is an archaeological site near Pasadena in Anne Arundel County, Maryland. The site consists of several large outcroppings of quartzite and sandstone, that may have been utilized by prehistoric Native American groups as early as the Middle Archaic period, if not earlier.

It was listed on the National Register of Historic Places in 1991.

References

External links
, including photo from 1989, at Maryland Historical Trust

Quarries in the United States
Archaic period in North America
Archaeological sites in Anne Arundel County, Maryland
Archaeological sites on the National Register of Historic Places in Maryland
Native American history of Maryland
Quartzite formations
Woodland period
National Register of Historic Places in Anne Arundel County, Maryland